Dr. Muhamad Akmal bin Saleh (born 2 July 1988) is a Malaysian politician from the United Malays National Organisation (UMNO), a component party of the ruling Barisan Nasional (BN) coalition who has served as Member of the Melaka State Executive Council (EXCO) in the BN state administration under Chief Minister Sulaiman Md Ali since November 2021 and Member of the Melaka State Legislative Assembly (MLA) for Merlimau since November 2021. He has served as the 15th Youth Chief of UMNO since March 2023. He is also the Deputy Youth Chief of UMNO of Melaka and Youth Chief of UMNO of Jasin.

Political career

Muhamad was elected to the Melaka State Legislative Assembly in the 2021 state election, winning the seat of Merlimau from Roslan Ahmad also of the ruling BN coalition. In addition, he was also appointed as Member of the Melaka state EXCO in charge of Health and Anti-drugs by Chief Minister Sulaiman in November 2021.

Election results

References

External links 
 

1988 births
Living people
Malaysian people of Malay descent
Malaysian Muslims
United Malays National Organisation politicians
21st-century Malaysian politicians
Members of the Malacca State Legislative Assembly
Malacca state executive councillors